Ruben Edaurdo Acosta (born 21 July 1978) is an Argentine professional boxer. He is the current WBO NABO cruiserweight champion.

Biography
On 20 May 2005, Acosta had a 10-0-1KOs pro record when he face top contender Mariano Natalio Carrera for the vacated WBA Fedelatin middleweight title, Carrera dominated Acosta knocking him down twice then winning a unanimous decision, Score being 100-92 100-93 100-93. After the Carrera lost, Acosta had points wins over Ramon Patricio Vargas and Nestor Fabian Casanova. On 15 November 2006 Acosta fought former world champion Anthony Mundine in Entertainment Centre, Newcastle, New South Wales, Australia, which ended in a KO in the four round with Acosta failed to beat the count after a viscous left hook to the liver, Acosta was able to get back up after the fight was stopped, only to fall once more. Acosta racked a four win streak before losing to future WBO Super middleweight champ Karoly Balzsay by unanimous decision, with all three judges scoring 119-109. On 2 February 2008, Acosta fought former two time WBA light middleweight world champion Julio César Vásquez with Acosta winning by KO in the first round with a bodyshot, Acosta now has a five win streak including a win over formerly undefeated Eduardo Cardoso.

Stieglitz VS Acosta
January 9, 2010, Acosta was defeated by WBO Super Middleweight Champion Robert Stieglitz via TKO5.

Smith VS Acosta
October 26, 2013, Acosta fought against Callum Smith for the vacant WBC International super middleweight title, losing by KO on the 6 round.

Regional titles
WBO Latino Super middleweight Champion
WBA Fedelatin Middleweight Champion
WBC Mundo Hispano Middleweight Champion
South American Super Middleweight Champion
WBO NABO Cruiserweight Champion

Professional Boxing record  (incomplete)

References

External links

Living people
1978 births
Argentine male boxers
People from Florencio Varela Partido
Super-middleweight boxers
Sportspeople from Buenos Aires Province